Adwadgi  is a village in the southern state of Karnataka, India. Administratively, Adwadgi is under Sugooru gram panchayat, Shorapur Taluka of Yadgir district in Karnataka. The village of Adwadgi is  3 km by road northeast of the village of Sugur and 7.5 km by road south of the village of Hemnoor.  The nearest railhead is in Yadgir.

Demographics 
In the 2001 census, Adwadgi had 646 inhabitants, with 319 males and 327 females.

In the 2011 census, Adwadgi had a population of 1024.

See also
 Yadgir

Notes

External links 
 

Villages in Yadgir district